Władysław I Herman ( 1044 – 4 June 1102) was the duke of Poland from 1079 until his death.

Accession
Władysław was the second son of the Polish duke Casimir the Restorer and Maria Dobroniega of Kiev. As the second son, Władysław was not destined for the throne. However, due to the flight from Poland of his older brother Bolesław the Bold in 1079, he became duke of Poland. Opinions vary on whether Władysław played an active role in the plot to depose his brother or whether he was handed the authority simply because he was the best candidate to replace Bolesław.

German relations
In 1080, in order to improve the relations between Poland and Bohemia, Władysław married Judith, the daughter of Duke Vratislaus II of Bohemia, a vassal of the Holy Roman Empire. After this, Władysław's foreign policy gravitated strongly towards appeasing the Holy Roman Empire, and he accepted the overlordship of Emperor Henry IV. While Vratislaus was declared a king in 1085 by Emperor Henry, Władysław never pursued kingship. Soon after, he was forced by the barons of Poland to recall his nephew Mieszko Bolesławowic from exile in Hungary. Mieszko accepted the overlordship of his uncle and gave up his claim to Poland in exchange for becoming first in the line of succession. Władysław was forced to accept the terms of his nephew, because his eldest and only son at that time, Zbigniew, was born from a union not recognized by the church. Władysław's relations with Henry considerably improved after Judith of Bohemia died and Władysław married Henry's sister Judith, dowager queen of Hungary, in 1089.

Władysław abandoned the alliance with Hungary favored by his deposed brother, and joined the anti-papal camp. He also resumed paying tribute for Silesia to Bohemia. In addition, Kraków and Cieszyn were ceded to Bohemia, and Lubusz Land was lost to Germany, while Przemyśl Land in the east was lost to Halych-Ruthenia. Władysław did make attempts to regain control of Pomerania, and through numerous expeditions was temporarily (1090–1091) able to do so.

Domestic difficulties
Although Władysław was formally duke of Poland, in reality the barons who banished his brother used this victory to strengthen their position. It is not surprising, therefore, that within a short time Władysław was forced to give up the government to his count palatine (Polish: wojewoda), a nobleman named Sieciech. Sieciech's administration of the realm was negatively perceived by those of the barons who were not the beneficiaries of the power shift.

The birth of Bolesław Wrymouth to Władysław and Judith of Bohemia changed the political situation in Poland. Władysław's nephew Mieszko was already seventeen at that time and was, by the previous agreement made after his return, the first in line to succeed. In 1089 Mieszko died under mysterious circumstances, probably poisoned on the orders of Sieciech and Judith of Swabia. Almost immediately, Zbigniew was sent to Germany and placed in the Quedlinburg Abbey. With the idea of forcing his first-born son to take holy vows, Władysław intended to deprive him of any chance of succession.

In 1090 Sieciech, with help of Polish forces under his command, managed to gain control of Gdańsk Pomerania, albeit for a short time. Major towns were garrisoned by Polish troops, the rest were burned, in order to thwart any future resistance. Several months later, however, a rebellion of native elites led to the restoration of the region's independence from Poland.

Sieciech's tyrannical rule reflected negatively on Władysław, causing a massive political migration out of Poland. In 1093 Silesia rebelled, and the comes Magnus, with the assistance of the Bohemian and Polish knights, welcomed Zbigniew after he escaped from Germany; however, soon Sieciech captured the prince and imprisoned him. The increasing dissatisfaction in the country forced the release of Zbigniew in 1097. Immediately after this Władysław (after an unsuccessful retaliatory expedition against Silesia and being forced to recognize Zbigniew as the legitimate heir) appointed his sons as commanders of the army which was formed in order to recapture Gdańsk Pomerania.

Simultaneously a great migration of Jews from Western Europe to Poland began circa 1096, around the time of the First Crusade. Władysław, a tolerant ruler, attracted the Jews to his domains, and permitted them to settle throughout the entire country without restriction.

Soon Zbigniew and Bolesław decided to join forces and demanded that the reins of government should be handed over to them. Władysław agreed to divide the realm between the brothers, each to be granted his own province while he himself kept control of Mazovia and its capital at Płock. Władysław also retained control of the most important cities--i.e., Wrocław, Kraków and Sandomierz. Zbigniew's province encompassed Greater Poland including Gniezno, Kuyavia, Łęczyca and Sieradz. Bolesław's territory included Lesser Poland, Silesia and Lubusz Land. However, Sieciech, alarmed by the evident diminution of his power, began to intrigue against the brothers. Władysław decided to support him against his own sons. Defeated, and after the mediation of Martin, Archbishop of Gniezno, the Duke was forced to confiscate Sieciech's properties and exiled him in 1101.

Erection of churches

Władysław founded several churches in Poland. Most notably he was the founder of the Romanesque Wawel Cathedral of which the Silver Bells Tower still remains standing. He was also very fond of Saint Giles (Polish: Idzi) to whom he founded no less than three churches: in Kraków, Inowlodz and Giebultow. This is attributed to the fact that while his first wife was finally pregnant after six years of childless marriage, the Duke sent rich gifts to the Benedictine monastery of Saint Gilles in southern France, begging for a healthy child. When a son was born, Wladyslaw began building churches in his honor. According to legend, he also founded a church "on the sand" dedicated to the Virgin Mary, which was later granted to the Carmelites.

Health

According to Gallus Anonymus, Władysław long suffered from a debilitating ailment that affected his legs. There is also a legend which states that in 1086 Władysław was affected by a terrible pox, with abscesses that affected his nose and face. According to the legend, the Holy Virgin appeared in the duke's dream and led him to find the cure in the sandy area outside the city. Once healed Władysław founded a Church of the Holiest Virgin Mary "on the sand" in the spot where he found the cure.

Władysław died on 4 June 1102, without resolving the issue of succession, leaving his sons to struggle for supremacy. His body was interred in the Płock Cathedral.

Marriages and issue
Before Władysław became duke of Poland, probably during the 1070s, he had a relationship with a woman named Przecława, whose exact origins are unknown, although some sources stated that she belonged to the Prawdzic clan. Her status is also a matter of dispute among the historians: some believed that she was only Władysław's mistress and others asserted that she was his wife, but this union was performed under pagan rituals and in consequence not recognized by the Church as a valid marriage. By 1080, one year after Władysław ascended to the Polish throne, Przecława either died or was sent away; it is believed by some sources that after she was dismissed by Władysław, Przecława took the veil under the name Christina and died around 1092. This union produced a son, Zbigniew (b. c. 1070/73 – d. c. 1112/14), who was considered illegitimate.

In 1080, Władysław married Judith ( 1056 – 1086), daughter of Vratislaus II of Bohemia. They had a son, Bolesław Wrymouth (1086 – 1138). In 1089 Władysław married Judith (1054 – 1105), daughter of Emperor Henry III and widow of King Solomon of Hungary. Their daughters were:
Sophia (b. c. 1089 – d. bef. 12 May 1112), married before 1108 to Iaroslav Sviatopolkovich, Prince of Volhynia, son of Sviatopolk II of Kiev.
Agnes (b. c. 1090 – d. 29 December 1127), abbess of Quedlinburg (1110) and Gandersheim (1111).
possibly Adelaide (b. c. 1091 – d. 25/26 March 1127), married before 1118 to Margrave Diepold III of Vohburg
A daughter (b. c. 1092 – d. bef. 1111), married c. 1111 to a Polish lord.

See also
History of Poland (966–1385)

References

1040s births
1102 deaths
Year of birth uncertain
11th-century Polish monarchs
12th-century Polish monarchs
Piast dynasty
Burials at Płock Cathedral
11th-century rulers in Europe
People of Byzantine descent